Ataul Hakim Sarwar Hasan is a Lieutenant general of Bangladesh Army and Chief of General Staff (CGS) of Bangladesh Army. He is the former Vice-Chancellor of Bangladesh University of Professionals.

Early life
Ataul Hakim Sarwar was born on 1 January 1966 in Old Dhaka. He received his commission in the infantry corp in 1984. He graduated from Defence Services Command and Staff College and Brazilian Army Command and General Staff College.

Career
Hasan commanded an Infantry Battalion and commanded 71st Mechanized Brigade & 77th Infantry Brigade. He was the first General Officer Commanding of 10th Infantry Division & Area Commander of Cox’s Bazar Area. In 2017, he was the chief patron of Bangladesh International School and College. He also served as the Logistics Area Commander. He also served as the General Officer Commanding of 55th Infantry Division & Area Commander, Jashore Area. He served as the Director General of Prime Minister’s Office, Armed Forces Division. He served as Strategic Planner of US Central Command.

On 5 March 2020, Hasan was appointed Vice-Chancellor of Bangladesh University of Professionals. He was the President of Jashore Golf and Country Club.

Hasan was appointed commandant of National Defence College on 26 November 2020 as soon as he promoted to 3 Star General. On 13 January 2021, he was appointed Chief of General Staff of Bangladesh Army.

Personal life 
Hasan is married to Begum Farzana Hasan, a senior teacher at Shaheed Anwar Girls School & College. The couple is blessed with 2 sons.

References

Living people
1966 births
Bangladesh Army generals
Vice-Chancellors of Bangladesh University of Professionals
National Defence College (Bangladesh) alumni